Viktor Egnell  (March 22, 1872 – March 13, 1952) was a Swedish politician. He was a member of the Centre Party. He was a member of the Parliament of Sweden (upper chamber) 1936–1943.

Members of the Riksdag from the Centre Party (Sweden)
1872 births
1952 deaths
Members of the Första kammaren